Two ships in the United States Navy have been named USS Philip in honor of John Woodward Philip, a distinguished naval officer of the American Civil War and Spanish–American War.

United States Navy ship names